Carter G. Woodson Regional Library is one of two regional libraries in the Chicago Public Library system in Chicago, in the U.S. state of Illinois, serving as the hub for the approximately 24 branch libraries of the South District.  It is named for Carter Woodson, founder of the Association for the Study of African American Life and History.  The library is in Chicago's Washington Heights neighborhood at 9525 S. Halsted St.  It is a full service library and is ADA compliant.  As with all libraries in the Chicago Public Library system, it has free Wi-Fi internet service.

Overview 

The building opened on December 9, 1975 and, in addition to providing everyday library services, is home to the Vivian G. Harsh Research Collection of Afro-American History & Literature, which was started by Ms. Harsh when she was director of the George Cleveland Hall branch of Chicago Public Library. The building was expanded in 1988 to provide updated facilities for the Harsh Collection.

References

External links 
 Carter G. Woodson Regional Library
 Chicago Public Library homepage

Public libraries in Chicago
Library buildings completed in 1975